The Flower Thief is a 1960 underground film directed by Ron Rice.

Production
Shot in 1959 in San Francisco's North Beach neighborhood and using surplus 16mm film, the film features non-professional actors like Taylor Mead and Eric "Big Daddy" Nord, and Beat poets living in North Beach such as Bob Kaufman.
Skippy Alvarez, who worked at Vesuvio's Bar and lived at The Swiss American Hotel, appears in the film. She had just returned from attempting to bail Bob Kaufman out of jail. She spoke about how she wished the North Beach police would leave the Beats alone & quit hassling them.

See also
 List of American films of 1960
 The Beat Generation

References

External links
The Flower Thief at IMDB

1960s avant-garde and experimental films
1960 films
American avant-garde and experimental films
American black-and-white films
American independent films
Films about the Beat Generation
Films directed by Ron Rice
Films shot in 16 mm film
1960s English-language films
1960s American films